Vincent Robert Crowe (born 13 January 1946) is a former Australian rules footballer who played with Richmond and Hawthorn in the Victorian Football League (VFL). 

In 2003 he was selected in Prahran's Team of the Century.

Notes

External links 

Living people
1946 births
Australian rules footballers from Victoria (Australia)
Richmond Football Club players
Hawthorn Football Club players
Prahran Football Club players